Gunda (English: The Terrorist) is a 1976 Bangladeshi film starring Alamgir, Abdur Razzak and Kabori opposite him. Khalil Ullah Khan earned Bangladesh National Film Award for Best Supporting Actor.

Cast 
 Kabori
 Razzak
 Alamgir
 Khalil Ullah Khan

Music
The film's music was composed by Alam Khan and written by Mukul Chowdhury.

Awards
Bangladesh National Film Awards
 Best Supporting Actor - Khalil Ullah Khan

References

Bengali-language Bangladeshi films
Films scored by Alam Khan
1976 films
1970s Bengali-language films